The 2013–14 Wisconsin Badgers men's basketball team represented the University of Wisconsin–Madison in the 2013–14 NCAA Division I men's basketball season. This was Bo Ryan's 12th season as head coach at Wisconsin. The team played their home games at the Kohl Center in Madison, Wisconsin and were members of the Big Ten Conference. They finished the season 30–8, 12–6 in Big Ten play to finish in a tie for second place. They lost in the semifinals in the Big Ten tournament to Michigan State. They received at-large bid to the NCAA tournament as a No. 2 seed in the West region, their 16th straight trip to the Tournament. They defeated American and Oregon to advance to the Sweet Sixteen. They defeated Baylor and Arizona to advance to the Final Four. However, they were eliminated by Kentucky in the Final Four.

Previous season 
The Badgers finished the 2012–13 season 23–12, 12–6 in Big Ten play to finish in a tie for fourth place. They defeated Michigan and Indiana before losing to Ohio State in the Big Ten tournament championship. They received an at-large bid to the NCAA tournament for the 15th consecutive year as a No. 5 seed. They were upset by No. 12-seeded Ole Miss in the Second Round.

Departures

2013 Commitments

Awards
All-Big Ten by Media
 Frank Kaminsky - 1st team
 Sam Dekker - 3rd team
 Josh Gasser - Honorable mention
 Traevon Jackson - Honorable mention

All-Big Ten by Coaches
 Frank Kaminsky - 1st team
 Sam Dekker - 2nd team
 Ben Brust - Honorable mention
 Josh Gasser - All-Defensive team
 Nigel Hayes - Freshman of the Year & All-Freshman team

Roster

Schedule and results
Source

|-
!colspan=12 style=| Canadian trip

|-
!colspan=12 style=| Exhibition

|-
!colspan=12 style=|Non-conference regular season

|-
!colspan=9 style=|Big Ten regular season

|-
!colspan=9 style=| Big Ten tournament

|-
!colspan=9 style=|NCAA tournament

Rankings

Player statistics

As of April 6, 2014

		        MINUTES    |--TOTAL--|   |--3-PTS--| |-F-THROWS-| |---REBOUNDS---|                 |-SCORING-| 
## Player           GP GS Tot  Avg  FG  FGA  Pct  3FG 3FA Pct FT FTA  Pct  Off Def Tot Avg PF FO  A TO Blk Stl Pts Avg 
44 Kaminsky, Frank  38 38 1032 27.2 196 371 .528  37  98 .378 101 132 .765  81 159 240 6.3 96  1  49  39 66 26 530 13.9
01 Brust, Ben       38 38 1318 34.8 156 372 .419  96 244 .393  80  89 .899  31 140 171 4.5 36  0  50  27  2 29 488 12.8
15 Dekker, Sam      38 38 1134 29.8 168 358 .469  42 129 .326  94 137 .686  65 166 231 6.1 52  0  52  41 22 29 472 12.4
12 Jackson, Traevon 38 38 1170 30.8 122 299 .408  34  89 .382 129 167 .772  20 124 144 3.8 88  0  151 82  4 26 407 10.7
21 Gasser, Josh     38 38 1270 33.4  84 194 .433  47 109 .431 118 136 .868  21 131 152 4.0 97  2  72  32  6 25 333  8.8
10 Hayes, Nigel     38  0  663 17.4  98 192 .510   0   0 .000  96 164 .585  34  72 106 2.8 99  1  36  45 20 32 292  7.7
24 Koenig, Bronson  37  0  572 15.5  51 115 .443  22  67 .328   6   8 .750  18  28  46 1.2 50  0  41  18  3 11 130  3.5
13 Dukan, Duje      38  0  309  8.1  41  82 .500  15  41 .366  10  14 .714  19  38  57 1.5 32  0  11   8  1  3 107  2.8
03 Marshall, George  2  0   25 12.5   1   4 .250   0   2 .000   2   2 1.000  0   0   0 0.0  2  0   1   1  0  0   4  2.0
34 Bohannon, Zach   14  0   27  1.9   4   7 .571   2   3 .667   2   2 1.000  2   3   5 0.4  1  0   0   0  0  2  12  0.9
11 Hill, Jordan     11  0   25  2.3   1   7 .143   1   4 .250   4   7 .571   1   2   3 0.3  5  0   1   2  0  0   7  0.6
30 Brown, Vitto     14  0   44  3.1   3  11 .273   0   0 .000   0   3 .000   0  12  12 0.9  5  0   3   2  0  0   6  0.4
32 Anderson, Evan   14  0   36  2.6   2   6 .333   1   4 .250   0   0 .000   0   3   3 0.2  9  0   1   2  3  0   5  0.4
   Team                                                                    45  51  96       2      8 
   Total..........  38  7625  927 2018 .459 297 790 .376 642 861 .746 337 929 1266 33.3 574  4 468  307 127 183 2793 73.5
   Opponents......  38  7625  915 2134 .429 184 540 .341 418 579 .722 350 862 1212 31.9 763  6 364  370 105 161 2432 64.0

Records and milestones
 On November 19, 2013, Frank Kaminsky broke the Wisconsin's single-game record for most points, with 43 against North Dakota.
 On December 4, 2013, Bo Ryan won his 300th game at Wisconsin during a 48–38 victory over Virginia. Ryan became only the 9th Big Ten head coach to win 300 games.
 On January 8, 2014, Wisconsin defeated Illinois 95–70 giving the Badgers a 16–0 record, the best start in the school's history.
 On March 14, 2014, Wisconsin defeated Minnesota 83–57 giving coach Bo Ryan his 700th career victory as a head coach.
 On March 22, 2014, Ben Brust broke the record for most career three-pointers with his 228th vs. the Oregon during an 85–77 victory in the third round of the 2014 NCAA tournament. The previous record was held by Tim Locom (1988–91).
On March 29, 2014, Wisconsin defeated Arizona 64-63 to qualify for the NCAA Final Four for the third time in school history, its first since the 2000 NCAA Division I men's basketball tournament

References

Wisconsin Badgers men's basketball seasons
Wisconsin
Wisconsin
NCAA Division I men's basketball tournament Final Four seasons
Badge
Badge